This is a discography of Giuseppe Verdi's last opera, Falstaff. It was first performed at La Scala, Milan, on 9 February 1893.

Recordings

The "Operadis" discography lists more than seventy other recordings, made at live performances. They include those conducted by Sir Thomas Beecham at the Metropolitan Opera in 1944 with Leonard Warren in the title role; Fritz Reiner with Warren at the Met (1948); Victor de Sabata with Mariano Stabile at La Scala (1951); Karajan and Gobbi at the Salzburg Festival (1957); Tullio Serafin with Gobbi at the Chicago Lyric Opera (1958); Lorin Maazel and Walter Berry at the Vienna State Opera (1983); James Levine and Paul Plishka at the Met (1992); Riccardo Muti and Juan Pons at La Scala (1993); Solti and José van Dam in Berlin (1993); and Zubin Mehta and Ruggero Raimondi at the Teatro Comunale, Florence (2006).

In October 1978 Solti conducted the soundtrack for Götz Friedrich's 1979 film of Falstaff. The recording, made by Decca in the Sofiensaal. Vienna, with the Deutsche Oper Berlin Chorus, the Vienna State Opera Chorus, and the Vienna Philharmonic Orchestra, featured Gabriel Bacquier as Falstaff, Richard Stilwell as Ford, Max-René Cosotti as Fenton, Karan Armstrong as Alice Ford, Jutta-Renate Ihloff as Nanetta and Márta Szirmay as Mistress Quickly.

References
Notes

Sources

External links
Detailed Falstaff discography – operadis-opera-discography.org.uk

Opera discographies
Operas by Giuseppe Verdi